Bernhard Fahner (born 4 July 1963 in Bern, Switzerland) is a retired Swiss alpine skier who competed in the 1988 Winter Olympics, finishing 15th in the Men's combined.

External links
 sports-reference.com
 

1963 births
Living people
Swiss male alpine skiers
Olympic alpine skiers of Switzerland
Alpine skiers at the 1988 Winter Olympics
Sportspeople from Bern
20th-century Swiss people